Toy Balloon is the 20th album by Scottish folk musician Bert Jansch released in 1998.

Track listing
All tracks composed by Bert Jansch; except where indicated

"Carnival" (Jackson C. Frank, Jansch) - 4:25
"She Moved Through the Fair" (Traditional) - 4:55
"All I Got" - 3:16
"Bett's Dance" - 2:46
"Toy Balloon (for Little Anna-Rebecca)" - 3:32
"Waitin' & Wonderin'" - 4:14
"Hey Doc" - 2:45
"Sweet Talking Lady" - 3:58
"Paper Houses" - 3:01
"Born and Bred in Old Ireland" - 3:10
"How It All Came Down" - 4:40
"Just a Simple Soul" - 3:54

Personnel
Bert Jansch - guitar, vocals
Marcus Cliffe - bass
Pick Withers - drums
Johnny Hodge - slide guitar, harmonica
Jay Burnett - keyboards
Pee Wee Ellis - saxophone
B. J. Cole - pedal steel
Janie Romer - backing vocal
Laura B - effects

References

Bert Jansch albums
1998 albums
Cooking Vinyl albums